Private First Class Jose F. Valdez (January 3, 1925 – February 17, 1945)  was a United States Army soldier who posthumously received the Medal of Honor — the United States' highest military decoration — for his actions near Rosenkranz, France, in the Battle of the Colmar Pocket during World War II.

Early years
Valdez was a Spanish-American born and raised in Gobernador, New Mexico (today a ghost town). He joined the United States Army at a recruiting station in Santa Fe, New Mexico in June 1944 (but was listed as a Utah Medal of Honor recipient). After completing his basic training, he was assigned to the 3rd Infantry Division.

World War II
The 3rd Infantry Division, which was under the command of Major General John W. O'Daniel, fought from North Africa through Sicily, Italy, France, and Germany during World War II.  On January 23, 1945, the 3rd Infantry Division was attacking German forces in Alsace as part of the Allied offensive to collapse the Colmar Pocket.

On January 25, 1945, Valdez was on patrol with 5 of his fellow soldiers at a small railway station near Rosenkranz, France, when unexpectedly they confronted an enemy counterattack.  An enemy tank was headed towards the patrol and Valdez, upon his own initiative, opened fire against the tank with his automatic rifle, action which made the tank withdraw.  After Valdez killed 3 enemy soldiers in a firefight, the Germans ordered a full attack and sent in two companies of infantrymen.

Valdez offered to cover the members of his patrol when the platoon leader ordered a withdrawal.  He fired upon the approaching enemy and his patrol members were able to reach American lines.  Valdez was wounded and was able to drag himself back to American lines, however, he died three weeks later from his wounds.

Medal of Honor citation

Awards and recognitions

Awards 
  Medal of Honor
  Purple Heart
  American Campaign Medal
  European-African-Middle Eastern Campaign Medal
  World War II Victory Medal
  French Croix de Guerre
  French Croix de guerre Fourragère

Honors 

Valdez was buried with full military honors in the Santa Fe National Cemetery located in Santa Fe, New Mexico.
, a technical research ship in operation during the 1960s.
Valdez Elementary School, an elementary School dedicated in north Denver, Colorado.
PFC Jose F. Valdez Memorial Highway, a 106-mile stretch of U.S. Route 64, from Tierra Amarilla to Bloomfield, in New Mexico.
Jose F. Valdez U.S. Army Reserve Center, located in Pleasant Grove, Utah, headquarters of the 405th Civil Affairs Battalion.
A memorial to Valdez was dedicated in Gobernador, New Mexico, in 2002.
A memorial at All Veterans Memorial Park in Berg Park, Farmington, New Mexico, was dedicated in 2009 honoring three northwest New Mexico residents who received the Medal of Honor; Valdez, USMC LCpl. Kenneth Lee Worley, and Army SSG Franklin D. Miller.

See also

List of Medal of Honor recipients for World War II
Hispanic Medal of Honor recipients
Hispanic Americans in World War II

References

External links

1925 births
1945 deaths
United States Army personnel killed in World War II
United States Army Medal of Honor recipients
United States Army soldiers
American people of Mexican descent
World War II recipients of the Medal of Honor
Burials at Santa Fe National Cemetery